Larkin Allen Collins Jr. (July 19, 1952 – January 23, 1990) was an American guitarist. He was one of the founding members and guitarists of the Southern rock band Lynyrd Skynyrd, and co-wrote many of the band's songs with frontman and original lead singer Ronnie Van Zant. He was born in Jacksonville, Florida.

Personal life 
Collins started playing guitar at 12 years of age, with a few lessons from his stepmother, Leila Collins, a country-and-western guitarist, teaching him a few notes, and receiving his first guitar and amplifier from his father after a falling-out between the two. Collins attended Nathan B. Forrest High School.

In 1970, Collins married Kathy Johns. All of his bandmates were in his wedding party, but Kathy worried that the band's long haired appearance would disturb her parents. To solve this problem, she required all the band members to keep their hair under wigs at the wedding ceremony. The wedding reception was one of the first public performances of "Free Bird" complete with the trademark extended guitar jam at the end. Collins's family grew with the birth of his daughter Amie, followed quickly by Allison. Collins was also fond of cars, and had a fairly extensive car collection, one of his favorites being a 1932 Plymouth coupe nicknamed "Dixie Blue".

Career 

Allen Collins joined Skynyrd in Jacksonville, Florida, just two weeks after its formation by Ronnie Van Zant and Gary Rossington, along with Bob Burns and Larry Junstrom. Knowing that Collins played guitar and owned his own equipment, the band decided to approach him about joining them. Van Zant and Burns both had a reputation for trouble, and Collins fled on his bicycle and hid up a tree when he saw them pull up in his driveway. They soon convinced him that they were not there to beat him up and he agreed to join the band, then known as The One Percent.

Collins and lead singer Ronnie Van Zant co-wrote many of the biggest Skynyrd hits, including "Free Bird", "Gimme Three Steps", and "That Smell". The band received national success beginning in 1973 while opening for the Who on their Quadrophenia tour.

On October 20, 1977, an airplane carrying the band crashed into a forest in Mississippi, killing three band members, including Van Zant. Collins was seriously injured in the crash, suffering two broken vertebrae in his neck and severe damage to his right arm. While amputation was recommended, Collins' father refused and he eventually recovered.

During the early 1980s, Collins continued to perform on stage in the Rossington-Collins Band which enjoyed modest success, releasing two albums (Anytime, Anyplace, Anywhere, and This Is the Way), and charting a few singles (notably "Don't Misunderstand Me").

Tragedy struck again just as the Rossington Collins Band was getting off the ground. In 1980, during the first days of the debut concert tour, Collins's wife, Kathy, suddenly died of a hemorrhage during the miscarriage of their third child. This forced the tour's cancellation. With the lingering effects of losing his friends in the plane crash, Kathy's death devastated Collins.

The Rossington-Collins Band disbanded in 1982. Collins continued to pursue music, starting the Allen Collins Band, which released one album, Here, There & Back in 1983. The six members included two Skynyrd bandmates: keyboardist Billy Powell and bassist Leon Wilkeson, along with lead singer Jimmy Dougherty, drummer Derek Hess, and guitarists Barry Lee Harwood and Randall Hall. In 1984, Collins tried to resurrect the band, hiring Jacksonville guitarist Mike Owings and bassist Andy Ward King. Later members included guitarist-vocalist Michael Ray FitzGerald and bassist "Filthy Phil" Price.

Accident, band reunions and death 
On January 29, 1986, Collins was driving a new black Ford Thunderbird when he was involved in a car accident that claimed the life of his girlfriend, Debra Jean Watts, and paralyzed the guitarist from the waist down, with limited use of his arms and hands. Collins pleaded no contest to vehicular manslaughter as well as driving under the influence of alcohol. He would never play guitar on stage again as a result of his injuries.

Collins' last performance with Lynyrd Skynyrd was at the band's first reunion after the plane crash at the 1979 Volunteer Jam V in Nashville, Tennessee. All remaining members of Lynyrd Skynyrd reunited officially in 1987, but due to his injury, Collins only served as musical director.  As part of his plea bargain for the 1986 accident, Collins addressed fans at every Skynyrd concert with an explanation of why he could not perform, citing the dangers of drinking and driving, as well as drugs and alcohol. Also because of Collins' accident, the band donated a sizable amount of concert proceeds from the 1987–88 tour to the Miami Project, which is involved in treatment of paralysis. Collins founded Roll For Rock Wheelchair Events and Benefit Concerts in 1988 to raise awareness and to provide opportunities for those living with spinal cord injuries and other physical disabilities.

Allen Collins died on January 23, 1990, from chronic pneumonia, a complication of the paralysis. He is buried beside his wife in Jacksonville, Florida.

In 2006, Collins was posthumously inducted into the Rock and Roll Hall of Fame as a member of Lynyrd Skynyrd.

Instruments 

In the early days of Lynyrd Skynyrd, Collins used a black Gibson Flying V. This guitar was stolen, along with Gary Rossington's white Gibson SG, when the band's van was broken into after a gig. For most of his tenure in Skynyrd, Collins used a Gibson Firebird fitted with a chrome-covered, "dog-eared" P-90 pickup in the bridge position and a Gibson "teaspoon" nickel vibrato arm. In 1976 he switched to a natural-finished korina 1958 Gibson Explorer that he had bought for about $3,000 and used that guitar throughout his tenure with the Allen Collins Band.

In late 1977 Collins began occasionally playing a Gibson Les Paul Special, with a double cutaway, P-90s, a sunburst finish, and modded with a Lyre Tremolo. He continued to use this guitar into the Rossington Collins Band as well. On "Gimme Back My Bullets", "Sweet Home Alabama", "Every Mothers Son" Collins used a Sunburst Fender Stratocaster after Ed King had left. Collins has also been filmed playing an all-black Stratocaster with a rosewood fingerboard, white pickups and white control knobs.

In 2003 Gibson Guitars honored Allen with a limited edition Explorer. Like his original instrument these are made of African limba wood (korina) and feature an aged finish and a Maestro vibrola.

Discography 

With Lynyrd Skynyrd
 (Pronounced 'Lĕh-'nérd 'Skin-'nérd) (1973)
 Second Helping (1974)
 Nuthin' Fancy (1975)
 Gimme Back My Bullets (1976)
 One More from the Road (1976)
 Street Survivors (1977)

With Rossington-Collins Band
 Anytime, Anyplace, Anywhere (1980)
 This Is the Way (1981)

With Allen Collins Band
 Here, There & Back (1983)

References

Further reading 
 Brant, Marley. Freebirds: The Lynyrd Skynyrd Story. Billboard Books; New York; 2002.  
 Odom, Gene with Frank Dorman. Lynyrd Skynyrd: Remembering the Free Birds of Southern Rock. Broadway Books; New York; 2002. .

External links 

1952 births
1990 deaths
20th-century American musicians
American male guitarists
American rock guitarists
Burials in Florida
Deaths from pneumonia in Florida
Lead guitarists
Lynyrd Skynyrd members
Musicians from Jacksonville, Florida
People with paraplegia
Survivors of aviation accidents or incidents
Guitarists from Florida
20th-century American guitarists
Rossington Collins Band members
Allen Collins Band members
20th-century American male musicians
Blues rock musicians
Road incident deaths in Florida